Royal Perth Golf Club is a golf club in South Perth, Western Australia.

The club started in the 1895 and was established in South Perth in 1909. It was granted permission to use the appellation "Royal" in 1937.

See also
List of golf clubs granted Royal status

References

External links

https://www.rpgc.com.au/cms/the-club/history/

Golf clubs and courses in Western Australia
Sports venues in Perth, Western Australia
South Perth, Western Australia
1909 establishments in Australia
Sports clubs established in 1895
Sports venues completed in 1909
Organisations based in Australia with royal patronage
Sporting clubs in Perth, Western Australia
Royal golf clubs